Kaha (also, Kyakha) is a village in the Lachin Rayon of Azerbaijan.

References 

Villages in Azerbaijan
Populated places in Lachin District